The 29erXX is a high performance sailing skiff, it was designed to allow light crews, particularly female crews, to sail twin trapeze boats and as a training boat for the more powerful 49er. The class gained International Sailing Federation Class status in May 2011, but lost it in 2014.

History
The 29erXX was designed by Julian Bethwaite with help from Jen Glass. The 29erXX is a high-powered rig for the existing 29er hull, indeed the new rig is extremely similar to the 29er's big brother - the 49er. This new rig is 0.45m longer than the standard 29er mast, and features carbon construction, double trapeze wires and three sets of shrouds. A masthead kite adds considerable speed downwind while the responsive 29er platform requires the sailors to move with precision through manoeuvres. Carbon tubes extend out the back of each rail to allow the crew to keep their weight further aft and the bow out of the water. Although initially many thought that the hull would be too small for its rig, extensive training on San Francisco Bay has disproved that notion. The lack of an adjustable rudder or other extra controls make the 29erXX a simple design, yet it is extremely sensitive to sailors' movements. 29erXX sailors must be incredibly athletic and coordinated as the skiff provides a continuous challenge to even the most advanced sailors.

The first international regatta was held in Weymouth, UK, in the summer of 2006. The event brought together 27 men's, women's and mixed teams from 8 countries providing
valuable input to help make this a mature, well designed boat.

Downwind the 29erXX has a considerable advantage over the original 29er due to the increased sail size, masthead kite and the ability to have both crew members on the wire. Upwind the difference is less noticeable but again the 29erXX has the advantage.

In April 2007, at the Women's High Performance Dinghy Evaluation Event in Hyères, France, ISAF conducted extensive trials of the 29erXX as a possible choice for a women's high performance dinghy class at the 2016 Olympics

Events

World Champions

References

External links
UK 29er Class Association

Dinghies
Former classes of World Sailing
2000s sailboat type designs